Baju Bagha is a union in Bagha Upazila of Rajshahi District of Bangladesh.

Representative 
Current chairman- Adv. Firoz Ahmed Ronzu

List of past chairmen

See also
Rajshahi District
Bagha Upazila
Bagha Municipality

References

Unions of Rajshahi Division